Tertius Maarman (born 14 April 1987, in Port Elizabeth) is a South African rugby union player who played for the  between 2008 and 2018, making 145 appearances. His regular position was fly-half or full-back.

Career

Youth
He had a short spell in the  Under-19 team in 2006.

Griffons
Despite being named in the squad for the 2007 Vodacom Cup – and even on the bench for the match against the  – he made his first class debut the following season in the same competition when he appeared as a substitute against . He broke into their Currie Cup squad in 2009, when he made four appearances for them in the 2009 Currie Cup First Division. During the 2012 Vodacom Cup, he played his 50th match for the team.

He was a key member of their 2014 Currie Cup First Division-winning side. He was the top try scorer during the second half of the competition to help his side reach the final. He also played in the final and helped the Griffons win the match 23–21 to win their first trophy for six years.

Representative rugby
In 2012, he was selected for the South African Barbarians (North) team against  that toured South Africa as part of the 2012 mid-year rugby test series.

References

South African rugby union players
Living people
1987 births
Griffons (rugby union) players
Sportspeople from Port Elizabeth
Rugby union fly-halves
Rugby union players from Port Elizabeth